Kanimuthu Paappa is a 1972 Indian Tamil-language drama film directed by S. P. Muthuraman in his directorial debut, and produced by S. Subramaniya Reddiyar. The film stars Jaishankar, R. Muthuraman, Lakshmi and Jaya. It was released on 26 May 1972.

Plot

Cast 

Jaishankar as
R. Muthuraman as Dr. Ravi
Lakshmi as
Jaya as Radha
Rajyalakshmi (debut)
Baby Sridevi
S. N. Lakshmi
Vijayasri
Kovai Kamatchi
S. V. Ramadoss
Suruli Rajan
I. S. R
M. Krishnamurthy

Soundtrack 
The music was composed by T. V. Raju. Lyrics were written by Poovai Senguttuvan. "Radhaiyin Nenjame" is based on the Hindi song "Khilte Hain Gul Yahan" from Sharmeelee (1971), and "Chithii Chollu Chollu" is based on "Hai Na Bolo Bolo" from Andaz (1971).

References

External links 

1970s Tamil-language films
1972 directorial debut films
1972 drama films
1972 films
Films directed by S. P. Muthuraman
Films scored by T. V. Raju
Indian drama films